Sidney K. Chu (born 22 July 1999 in Hong Kong) is a short track speed skater representing Hong Kong. Chu was Hong Kong's flag-bearer at the 2022 Winter Olympics in Beijing, China.

Career
In February 2022, Chu participated his first Olympic Games in Beijing, China. Finishing with the time of 44.857 seconds, he ranked 24th out of 32 competitors in the men's 500m short track speed skating at that Olympics.

References

External links

1999 births
Living people
Hong Kong male short track speed skaters
Olympic short track speed skaters of Hong Kong
Short track speed skaters at the 2022 Winter Olympics
Short track speed skaters at the 2017 Asian Winter Games